Pollanisus eungellae is a moth of the family Zygaenidae. It is only known from the type locality Eungella, an isolated rainforest area in north-eastern Queensland, Australia.

The length of the forewings is about 6 mm for males and 6.5 mm for females.

External links
Australian Faunal Directory
Zygaenid moths of Australia: a revision of the Australian Zygaenidae

eungellae
Moths of Australia
Moths described in 2005